Baillie & the Boys is the debut studio album by the American country music group of the same name. Three singles charted on the Billboard Hot Country Singles chart - "Oh Heart" at number 9, "He's Letting Go" at number 18, and "Wilder Days" at number 9. The album rose to the number 27 position in the Country Albums chart.

Track listing

Personnel
Compiled from liner notes.
Baillie & the Boys
 Kathie Baillie – lead vocals
 Michael Bonagura – vocals, acoustic guitar, electric guitar
 Alan LeBoeuf – vocals, bass guitar
Additional musicians
 Mike Brignardello – bass guitar
 Dennis Burnside – keyboards
 Mark Casstevens – acoustic guitar
 Paul Davis – Synclavier; additional vocals on "Heartless Night"
 Jerry Douglas – lap steel guitar
 Steve Gibson – palm pedal
 Doyle Grisham – steel guitar
 David Hungate – bass guitar
 Dirk Johnson – keyboards
 Shane Keister – keyboards
 Kyle Lehning – Synclavier
 Paul Leim – drums
 Larrie Londin – drums
 Kenny Mims – electric guitar
 Mark O'Connor – fiddle
 Michael Rhodes – bass guitar
 Billy Joe Walker, Jr. – electric guitar
Technical
 Joseph Bogan – engineering
 Paul Davis – production
 Tom Der – engineering
 Tom Harding – engineering
 Kyle Lehning – production, engineering, mixing
 Kirt Odle – engineering
 Doug Sax – mastering

Chart performance

References

1987 debut albums
Baillie & the Boys albums
RCA Records albums
Albums produced by Kyle Lehning